The Ambassador of Australia to Ethiopia is an officer of the Australian Department of Foreign Affairs and Trade and the head of the Embassy of the Commonwealth of Australia to the Federal Democratic Republic of Ethiopia. The position has the rank and status of an Ambassador Extraordinary and Plenipotentiary, holds non-resident accreditation for Djibouti, South Sudan (since 2011) and the Central African Republic (since 2014), and acts as Australia's representative to the African Union Commission, the United Nations Economic Commission for Africa, and the Intergovernmental Authority on Development.

The ambassador, since October 2021, is Julia Niblett. Ethiopia and Australia have enjoyed diplomatic relations since 1965 when Australia sent Walter Crocker to be High Commissioner to Kenya in Nairobi, with accreditation to Uganda and Ethiopia. Relations with Ethiopia from that time were dealt with by the High Commission in Kenya until 1984 when an embassy was opened in Addis Ababa, with representation to the Organisation of African Unity. This embassy was closed a few years later in 1987 due to budget cuts however and accreditation returned to the High Commission in Nairobi. On 8 September 2010, Lisa Filipetto was appointed as the first resident Ambassador to Ethiopia since 1987.

List of ambassadors

Notes 
 Also resident Ambassador to the Organisation of African Unity, 1985-1987.
 Also resident Ambassador to the African Union Commission, since 9 July 2002.
 Also non-resident Ambassador to the Republic of South Sudan, since 2011.
 Also non-resident Ambassador to the Central African Republic, since 2014.
 Also non-resident Ambassador to the Republic of Djibouti, since ????

See also
Foreign relations of Australia

References

External links
Australian Embassy, Ethiopia

 
 
 
 
Ethiopia
Australia